Barbara Williams may refer to:

Barbara Williams (actress) (born 1953), Canadian-born American actress
Barbara Williams (skating coach), American ice hockey skating coach
Barbara Roles Williams (born 1941), American former figure skater
Barbara A. Williams, African-American radio astrophysicist
Barbara Williams (writer) (1925 – 2013), American author of children's books